Taryn Brumfitt (born ) is an Australian body positivity advocate, writer, photographer, and filmmaker, known for founding the Body Image Movement and for her 2016 documentary film Embrace.

Early life and education 

She attended Unley High School in the Adelaide suburb of Netherby.

Career
Brumfitt was first a photographer. After the birth of her third child, she considered cosmetic surgery, as she was unhappy with the appearance of her body, but took up body building instead. 

Brumfitt founded the Body Image Movement in 2012. The Body Image Movement describes itself as "on a quest to end the global body-hating epidemic" and "working to put an end to body loathing and spread the message of body loving". It aims to recruit a  Body Image Movement Global Ambassador Program (BIMGAP), of people who will spread its message internationally through social media and local contacts. 

In 2016 Brumfitt's film Embrace was released. Brumfitt gave a talk at the TEDx event in Adelaide in 2016.

 the movement was crowdfunding for a documentary Embrace Kids aimed at children aged 8-12, which they hope to make available to schools around the world.

Recognition
In September 2018 Brumfitt was named one of The Australian Financial Review's 100 Women of Influence in the Global category. 

She was named 2023 Australian of the Year in January 2023.

Personal life
Brumfitt experienced family tragedy when her brother Jason died of a heroin overdose aged 28.

She married Matt Brumfitt in 2002 or 2003. He had previously worked in logistics but gave up that career to become the managing director of the Body Image Movement. They have three children. They divorced in 2020. 

 her partner is Tim Pearson.

Selected publications

References

External links
 

1970s births
Year of birth missing (living people)
Living people
Australian women writers
Australian film directors
Australian women film directors
Fat acceptance activists
Australian of the Year Award winners